Saint-Ghislain Abbey (Abbaye de Saint-Ghislain) was a monastery founded by Saint Ghislain around 650, located in Wallonia on the Haine (Hainaut, Belgium). It became a Benedictine monastery around 940, when reformed by Gérard of Brogne, and was suppressed in 1796.

History
On 2 June 965, Otto I, Holy Roman Emperor, confirmed Godfrey of Lower Lotharingia's gift to the abbey of 18 mansi of land in Villers-Saint-Ghislain.

Notable members
 Mathieu Moulart

References

See also
 List of Christian monasteries in Belgium

Christian monasteries in Hainaut (province)
1796 disestablishments in the Southern Netherlands
Benedictine monasteries in Belgium
Christian monasteries established in the 7th century
7th-century establishments in Francia
Christian monasteries disestablished in the 18th century
Christianity in Francia
7th-century churches in Belgium